Pycnopsis brachyptera is a species of beetle in the family Cerambycidae, and the only species in the genus Pycnopsis. It was described by Thomson in 1860.

References

Ceroplesini
Beetles described in 1860
Monotypic beetle genera